Splat! is a maze video game published for the ZX Spectrum in 1983 by Incentive Software of Reading, England. It was subsequently released for the Amstrad CPC, Commodore 64, and SAM Coupé.

Gameplay

The player guides Zippy, an X-shaped sprite, around a maze, viewed top-down, with solid walls, hazards and collectable rewards. The view of the maze scrolls randomly right, left, up or down. The object is for the player to survive for a period of time without making contact with either an edge of the playing area, represented as a brick walls, or hazards including water and spikes, all of which lose a life. If the player survives they receive a score bonus for completing the level and they proceed to the next level, which is a continuation of the maze, with less interval between scrolling steps and a shorter level duration. The first level lasts about two minutes, and by the seventh and final level this is down to about forty seconds. Points are awarded for collecting plums and clumps of grass, some of which are invisible.

Completing a level of the game triggers a voice saying "Yippee!". On the ZX Spectrum release this was remarkable due to it overcoming the Spectrum's rudimentary sound capabilities. It was a very early use of digitized speech sound effects in home computer games.

Promotion
In a launch promotion Incentive Software offered 500 pounds to the player with the highest score by 14 January 1984. The prize was won by 17-year-old James Tant, with 112,930 points. This was the first of Incentive Software's game-promoting competitions, for which the company was named.

Releases
The ZX Spectrum version was programmed by Ian Andrew, founder of Incentive Software, with Ian Morgan. It was released in 1983. In 1984 the Commodore 64 version was published, credited to Ian Andrew and Steve Zodiac. The games was released for the Amstrad CPC in 1985, attributed to Ian Andrew and Paul Shirley, using some different colours from previous releases such as pink rather than white maze background. The SAM Coupé version was released in 1991, coded by Colin Jordan and using that machine's advanced audio capabilities in the game's background music.

Legacy
The game was re-released for Spectrum, Commodore 64 and Amstrad CPC in 1992 by Alternative Software as part of the 4-Most Thrillers compilation along with Martech's Mega Apocalypse, The Fury and Vixen.

References

External links
 
 
 

1983 video games
Amstrad CPC games
Commodore 64 games
Single-player video games
Maze games
SAM Coupé games
Video games developed in the United Kingdom
ZX Spectrum games
Incentive Software games